Isostasius is a genus of parasitoid wasps belonging to the family Platygastridae.

The species of this genus are found in Europe and America.

Species:
 Isostasius affinis (Förster, 1861)
 Isostasius apillosioculus Szabó, 1981

References

Platygastridae
Hymenoptera genera